Buaraba is a rural locality in the Somerset Region, Queensland, Australia.

History 
Buaraba Provisional School opened on 1922. In January 1936 it became Buaraba State School. It closed on 1966.

Geography
Buaraba Creek flows through from west to south-east. Most of Ravensbourne National Park is within the locality.

Road infrastructure
The Esk-Hampton Road (State Route 85) runs along the north-western boundary, and the Gatton Esk Road passes through the eastern part.

References 

Suburbs of Somerset Region
Localities in Queensland